The Navarre Beach Causeway, also called the Navarre Beach Bridge, is a concrete bridge in Navarre, Florida, connecting the beach and mainland sides of the community. The bridge travels over the Santa Rosa Sound, which in turn, is part of the Intracoastal Waterway. The bridge is currently owned and managed by Santa Rosa County, as part of the roads and bridges department.

The bridge is a center point of the community and is included in the logos and symbols of many local businesses. The locally famous Navarre Beach sign is located on the mainland base of the bridge. The mainland side also used to contain a toll booth building but tolls were eliminated in 2004.

The Florida Department of Transportation rates the bridge as "functionally obsolete" due to it not meeting modern and current Coast Guard requirements regarding bridge height on the Intracoastal Waterway.

On April 23, 2021, it was announced that the Santa Rosa County commissioners had begun the planning process for the replacement of the bridge.

References 

Bridges in Navarre, Florida
Causeways in Florida

Navarre, Florida